Mouten Kop is a Belgian beer, brewed in concession by Brewery De Graal in Lochristi, Belgium, for the Hopjutters.

History 
Mouten Kop is the first beer of the "Hopjutters". The Hopjutters are four young brewers: Hans, Joke, Nathalie and Olivier.
That same year, 2010, Mouten Kop was voted "Best Homebrewed Beer in Flanders 2010" by a jury of professional brewers.
The name of the beer is a combination of houten kop and mout. "Houten kop" literally means "wooden head"; it's an expression referring to a hangover. "Mout" is "malt", a typical ingredient of beer.

The beer 
Mouten Kop is an amber-coloured beer, style India Pale Ale, with an alcohol volume of 6% abv and a bitterness of 35 IBU.
The ingredients are barley malt, water, hop, yeast and aromatic spices: coriander, cardamom and orange peel. Mouten Kop is bottle refermented beer. It is sold in bottles of 33 centilitres.

External links
 The homepage of the Hopjutters

References 

Belgian beer brands
Belgian brands
Lochristi